Michael Abels (born October 8, 1962) is an American composer best known for his genre-defying scores for the Jordan Peele films Get Out and Us, for which Abels won a World Soundtrack Award, the Jerry Goldsmith Award, a Critics Choice nomination, and multiple' critics awards. The hip-hop influenced score for Us was short-listed for the Oscars and was even named “Score of the Decade” by TheWrap. Other recent media projects include the films Bad Education, Nightbooks, Fake Famous, and the docu-series Allen v. Farrow. Current releases include Beauty which premiered at the Tribeca Film Festival and is now streaming on Netflix, Breaking (formerly 892) which premiered at Sundance, and his third collaboration with Jordan Peele, Nope.

Abels’ works also includes many concert works, such as At War With Ourselves for the Kronos Quartet, Isolation Variation for Hilary Hahn, and the opera Omar co-composed with Grammy-winning singer/songwriter Rhiannon Giddens. Some of these pieces are available on the Cedille Records, including Delights & Dances and Winged Creatures. Current commissions include a work for the National Symphony Orchestra and a guitar concerto for Mak Grgić.

Abels is co-founder of the Composers Diversity Collective, an advocacy group to increase visibility of composers of color in film, gaming and streaming media.

Early life 

Abels was born in Phoenix, Arizona. He spent his early years on a small farm in South Dakota, where he lived with his grandparents. Introduced to music via the family piano, he began showing an innate curiosity towards music at age 4. His music-loving grandparents convinced the local piano teacher to take him on as a student despite his age. At age 8, Abels began composing music, and by age 13, his first completed orchestral work was performed.
	
Upon graduating from high school, Abels attended the University of Southern California Thornton School of Music in Los Angeles. Abels, who is mixed race, eventually studied West African drumming techniques at California Institute for the Arts, and sang in a predominantly black church choir to further explore his African-American roots.

Filmography
Composer
 Get Out (2017)
 Us (2019)
 See You Yesterday (2019)
 All Day and a Night (2020)
 Bad Education (2020)
 Fake Famous (2021)
 Nightbooks (2021)
 Nope (2022)
 Breaking (2022)

Additional music
 Detroit (2017)

Other works 

 Falling Sky, ballet (2020)
 At war with ourselves, a concert piece on a poem by Nikky Finney
 Omar, an original opera on the life of Omar ibn Said co-composed by Rhiannon Giddens
 Get Out, in concert (2020)

Awards and nominations

References

External links
Profile at SubitoMusic.com
IMDB Page
Michael Abels Website

1962 births
20th-century American composers
20th-century classical composers
20th-century American male musicians
21st-century American composers
21st-century classical composers
21st-century American male musicians
African-American classical composers
American classical composers
African-American film score composers
African-American male classical composers
American film score composers
American male classical composers
Living people
American male film score composers
Musicians from Phoenix, Arizona
Musicians from South Dakota
USC Thornton School of Music alumni
Classical musicians from Arizona
20th-century African-American musicians
21st-century African-American musicians